Table tennis mixed doubles at the 2022 Commonwealth Games were held at the National Exhibition Centre at Birmingham, England from 4 to 7 August 2022.
100 competitors from 25 Commonwealth Nations competed.

Finals

Top half

Section 1

Section 2

Bottom half

Section 3

Section 4

References

External links 
 Table Tennis results at Commonwealth Games Birmingham 2022 website – Select Filter by Event - Mixed Doubles

Mixed doubles